Saturnia spini, the sloe emperor moth, is a moth of the family Saturniidae. The species was first described by Michael Denis and Ignaz Schiffermüller in 1775. It is found from eastern Austria and Poland across eastern and south-eastern Europe to Greece, Turkey, Armenia, Ukraine (including Crimea), and Kazakhstan.

It has a wingspan of 55–90 mm. Adults are on wing from April to June in one generation.

The larvae feed on Prunus spinosa, Rosa, Crataegus, Ulmus, Alnus, Salix, Populus and Malus in Europe. In Turkey and the Crimea it shows a preference for spiny members of the rose family.

There are no subspecies, although the population from Ukraine and southern Russia is sometimes treated as a subspecies, Saturnia spini haversoni Watson, 1911.

External links
 Saturniidae of Europe

Spini
Moths of Europe
Taxa named by Michael Denis
Taxa named by Ignaz Schiffermüller
Moths described in 1775